Tandil is the main city of the homonymous partido (department), located in Argentina, in the southeast of Buenos Aires Province, just north-northwest of Tandilia hills. The city was founded in 1823 and its name originates from the Piedra Movediza ("Moving Stone") which fell in 1912. The city is the birthplace of many notable sports personalities, as well as former president of Argentina Mauricio Macri.

Geography
The city borders Rauch and Azul (to the north), Ayacucho and Balcarce (to the east), Lobería, Necochea and Benito Juárez (to the south) and Azul and Benito Juárez (to the west).

Tandil is situated approximately midway between La Plata (the provincial capital),  to its NE,  and Bahía Blanca, lying the same distance to its SW; it is also  NW of Mar del Plata, and  SSW of Buenos Aires. Tandil is in a zone within the Pampas known as the Humid Pampas.

According to the 2010 census (INDEC), Tandil had a population of 116,916.

Climate
Mornings are often cold in autumn, winter and spring, and generally fresh in the summer. Fog is very common in autumn and winter, when frosts are also common. Minimum temperatures below  have been recorded in the winter months. Rainfall occurs throughout the year but more frequently in summer. Snow and heat waves are not very common.

The climatological data in the table below is from the period 1981–2010:

Place name

It is widely believed that the name of the city comes from the Mapuche words tan ("falling"), and lil ("rock"). It is probably a reference to the Piedra Movediza ("Moving Stone"), a large boulder which stood seemingly miraculously balanced on the edge of a rocky foothill. In order to demonstrate the slight movements of the boulder, it was common practice to place bottles under its base to watch them shatter. The "Moving Stone" toppled on February 29, 1912, and split into two pieces at the bottom of the hill.

In May 2007, a fix replica was set up in the same place where the original stood. The replica, made by engineering students, is actually cemented in place and does not teeter the way the original did.

History
The town was founded by Martín Rodríguez on April 4, 1823, named Fuerte Independencia (Fort Independence). In time the original natives became assimilated and mingled with the increasing European population. The vast majority of immigrants came from Spain and Italy, but also Danish people settled mainly guided by the Danish College of Missions, the latter constituting a very active community. Tandil was designated a city (although by modern standards it was a large town) in 1895 and became a popular tourist destination attracting people from Buenos Aires and other parts of Argentina.

The Piedra Movediza fell in 1912 and split in two below. Although it is impossible after the fact to ascertain the reason it fell, it is very possible that the delicately balanced rock was thrown off balance by the common practice of placing glass bottles under it and watching them explode. This was the way the locals would prove to visitors that the rock, in fact, moved, since the movement was too subtle to be detected by the naked eye. There have been projects to restore the rock, and a replica stone was placed where the original used to be. Other similar stones like El Centinela are also attractions, but none has the truly astonishing quality of teetering ever so slowly like the "moving rock" once did.

National University of Central Buenos Aires Province
The National University of Central Buenos Aires Province (Universidad Nacional del Centro de la Provincia Buenos Aires) is a public university located in Tandil. It was founded in 1974 as part of University of Buenos Aires Professor Alberto Taquini's plan to geographically diversify Argentina's National University system.

Established with the unification of a private school and a campus of the National University of the South, with more than 11,000 students, the university includes 10 schools offering 21 undergraduate, 58 graduate, and 19 post-graduate degrees. It maintains secondary campuses in Azul and Olavarría.

Personalities

Arts
 Rodolfo González Pacheco, writer, playwright, orator, anarchist journalist and activist
 Víctor Laplace, actor
 René Lavand, illusionist
 María Cristina Kiehr, soprano
 Facundo Cabral, singer, artist
 Robert Le Vigan, French actor and Nazi collaborator

Politics
 Diego Bossio, economist, executive director of ANSES, the national social security agency, from 2009 to 2015 
 Mauricio Macri, politician, former president of Argentina

Sports
 Juan Martín del Potro, tennis player, 2009 US Open winner and bronze and silver medalist in the Summer Olympics, nicknamed the 'Tower of Tandil'
 Mauro Camoranesi, footballer, 2006 FIFA World Cup Champion with the Italian national team
 María Irigoyen, tennis player
 Matias Rueda, Latin, South American and Argentine champion of professional boxing
 Juan Eduardo Eluchans, football player
 Guillermo Pérez Roldán, tennis player
 Mariana Pérez Roldán, tennis player
 Ariel Garcé, football player
 Esteban Saveljich, football player
 Mariano Pernía, football player
 Jorge Iván Pérez, football player
 Alejandro Agustín Domenez, football player
 Mariano González, football player
 Pablo Andrés González, football player
 Vicente Pernía, football player
 Máximo González, tennis player
 Diego Junqueira, tennis player
 Juan Mónaco, tennis player
 Bernardo Daniel Romeo, football player
 Mariano Zabaleta, tennis player
 Jorge Baliño, football referee, former FIFA-listed.

Gallery

References

External links 

  Official government website 
  Tourism, images and information about Tandil Argentina

Populated places in Buenos Aires Province
Populated places established in 1823
Cities in Argentina
Argentina